Events in the year 1913 in Portugal.

Incumbents
President:  Manuel de Arriaga 
Prime Minister: Duarte Leite (until 9 January), Afonso Costa (from 9 January)

Events
Establishment of the Associação dos Escoteiros de Portugal

Sport
1 November - Establishment of C.F. União

Births
Pedro de Merelim, historian, ethnographer
Numídico Bessone, sculptor
16 April - José dos Santos Garcia, bishop
18 March - Pocas, footballer
10 May - João Villaret, actor
11 May - Edgar Cardoso, civil engineer, university professor
15 June - José Simões, footballer
7 July - Anatólio Falé, professor of music, musician, composer 
27 July - António Martins, footballer
27 July - José Maria Antunes, footballer, manager
12 October - Vítor Guilhar, footballer (born in São Tomé and Príncipe)
10 November - Álvaro Cunhal, politician

Deaths
Rita Amada de Jesus, nun
7 November - Manuel Moral y Vega, photographer, publisher (died in Peru)
27 December - Infanta Antónia of Portugal (died in the German Empire)

References

 
Portugal
Years of the 20th century in Portugal
Portugal